Jules Patenôtre des Noyers (20 April 1845 – 26 December 1925) was a French diplomat.

Life
Patenôtre was born in Baye (Marne). Educated at the École Normale Supérieure, he taught for some years in the Algiers lycée before he joined the diplomatic service in 1871. He took service from 1873 to 1876 in the North of Persia. In 1880, he was minister plenipotentiary in Stockholm, Sweden.

In September 1883 he was named French minister to China and could conduct his most important mission in 1884, when he was sent as to regularize the French dominion in the Vietnamese protectorate state of Annam. The Harmand Treaty of 25 August 1883 had not been ratified by the French parliament and had upset the Chinese government. Patenôtre left Marseille at the end of April 1884 with a modified version of the treaty drafted by the Quai d'Orsay for signature by the king of Annam. At the end of May, he moved to a military vessel near Cap Saint-Jacques, learnt about the end of the Sino-French war and the Tientsin Accord of 11 May and received additional instructions from Paris. He arrived in Hải Phòng on 26 May and in Huế on 30 May, and started discussions with Nguyễn Văn Tường, the Regent. On 6 June 1884, the imperial Chinese seal - a symbol of the vassal status of Annam which had been given to Gia Long - was melted and the Patenôtre Treaty was signed.

He then proceeded to Shanghai where he arrived on 1 July to settle with China the difficulties which had arisen over the evacuation of the Chinese troops from Tongking. The negotiation failed, and the French admiral Sébastien Lespès resumed hostilities against China in August 1884. The next year Patenôtre signed with Li Hongzhang a treaty of peace at Tientsin, by which the French protectorate in Annam and Tongking was recognized, and both parties agreed to remain within their own borders in the future.

After serving as minister plenipotentiary in Morocco (1888–1891), Patenôtre was sent to Washington, D.C., where he was raised to the rank of ambassador in 1893. He was ambassador at Madrid from 1897 to 1902.

He was appointed a Grand Officer of the Order of Legion d'Honneur in 1902.

Family

Jules Patenotre des Noyers married Eleanor Elverson, who was the sister of James Elverson, Jr. (– 1929), and daughter of publisher James Elverson, Sr. (1838 – 1911) by wife Sallie Duvall (the three of them owners of The Philadelphia Inquirer). They had a daughter:
 Yvonne Patenôtre, married to Boniface, Marquis de Castellane (1896–1946), son of Boni de Castellane and Anna Gould, and had issue.

References 

 Billot, Albert (1886) L'affaire du Tonkin. Histoire diplomatique de l'établissement de notre protectorat sur l'Annam et de notre conflit avec la Chine, 1882-1885, par un diplomate, J. Hetzel et Cie, éditeurs, Paris, vi+ 430 pp.
 Devillers, Philippe (1998) Français et annamites . Partenaires ou ennemis ? 1856-1902, Denoël, Coll. Destins croisés, L'aventure coloniale de la France, Paris, 1998, 517 pp.
 McAleavy, Henry (1968) Black Flags in Vietnam: The Story of a Chinese Intervention Allen & Unwin, Ltd., London, New York, 1968, 296 pp.

1845 births
1925 deaths
École Normale Supérieure alumni
19th-century French diplomats
20th-century French diplomats
Ambassadors of France to the United States
Ambassadors of France to Spain